The 1976 Football Cup of Ukrainian SSR among KFK  was the annual season of Ukraine's football knockout competition for amateur football teams.

Competition schedule

First qualification round

|}
Replay

|}
Notes:
 The match Promin – Frunzenets was awarded 3–0 as a technical result.

Second qualification round

|}
Notes:
 The match Tytan – Avanhard was awarded 3–0 as a technical result.
 In the match Elektrovymiriuvach – Tytan possible has to be Bilshovyk instead of Tytan.

Quarterfinals (1/4)

|}

Semifinals (1/2)

|}

Final
November 12

|}

See also
 1977 KFK competitions (Ukraine)

External links
 (1977 - 40 чемпионат СССР Кубок Украинской ССР среди КФК) at footbook.ru

Ukrainian Amateur Cup
Ukrainian Amateur Cup
Amateur Cup